Dot-S (ドッツ, styled as .S) also known as Dot-Pin is a toy, similar to a Lite-Brite, created in 2005 by Japanese company Tomytec. The toys allow for the creation of pictures by placing colored pegs into holes in one or more boards. Many sets allow for the creation of various sprite characters from classic video games, with each peg representing one pixel.

Kits

There are 56 kits, including a starter kit which contains 17 colors. Many of sets are based on popular licenses from various companies.  Only some of the kits are listed below.

Disney 
Donald Duck
Jack Skellington
Mickey Mouse (Black and white, color versions)
Minnie Mouse (Black and white, color versions)
Stitch

Namco 
Dig Dug
Mappy
Pac-Man
The Tower of Druaga
Xevious

Nintendo 
Balloon Fight
Ice Climber
The Legend of Zelda - two sets, including "King of Games" Set
Nintendo Classics
Super Mario Bros. - Mario and Luigi (also available in large sets)

Other 
Doko Demo Issyo (Sony Computer Entertainment, two sets)
Space Invaders (Taito)

Colors

Pink
Red (3 shades)
Magenta
Yellow (2 shades)
Orange (2 shades)
Gold
Peach (4 shades)
Khaki
Brown (4 shades)
Olive
Green (5 shades)
Blue (5 shades)
Violet (3 shades)
White
Gray (4 shades)
Black
Glow

See also 
Lite-Brite

References

External links 
Official site (Japanese)

2000s toys